Ram Ki Janmabhoomi is a 2019 Indian Hindi-language drama film directed by Sanoj Mishra. The film is produced and written by Jitendra Narayan Singh and stars Manoj Joshi and Govind Namdev. The movie deals with the controversial issue of Ram Mandir. The film was theatrically released on 29 March 2019. It is produced by Jitendra Narayan Singh Tyagi.

Plot 

The date is 2 November 1990. There are Kar Sevaks arriving in large numbers to Ayodhya, amidst heavy police presence. In one incident, the police open fire on a group of Kar Sevaks, killing a number of them. That night, a police officer arrives at the scene and after seeing the dead bodies, informs an unnamed politician (netaji) over the radio that the task he had told has been completed.

Two prominent citizens of the town of Ayodhya, Sadanand Shastri and Naushad Ali are travelling in a car and discussing the shooting incident and the Ayodhya dispute. Shastri says, "The shooting incident is likely to inflame sentiments and aggravate the situation. In either case, there is no namaz being offered at the Babri Masjid for many years, and only bhajan and kirtan singing is being done, so who is responsible for turning this into a communal issue?" Naushad Bhai responds, "This is a political matter and there's not much we two can do about it." Shastri says "The Muslims of the country should move away from extreme thoughts and help in the construction of the Ram Mandir, and that way the whole dispute will be solved. This will also send a good impression about Muslims through the world and this can only be  done by the two of them."

Zafar Khan, the head of the All India Sharia Board addresses a gathering of Muslims "As a leader of the community, I have called the meeting to warn you all. Are you not aware that in the last few years, the Kafirs have become united and in the last few days lakhs of them have gathered around the Babri Masjid? Along with the Babri Masjid, they are liable to even enter your homes. You should remember they are the same people who used to be our slaves and on whom the Mughal Empire ruled. Today, they wish to destroy the Babri Masjid and build a temple in its place. If that happens, Islam in India will be at risk. If you do not want that to happen, you must get ready for another battle." The crowd gets incited and starts chanting "Takbir - Allah ho Akbar".

Naushad Ali, his daughter Rehana and his wife are discussing about seeing a potential groom the next day, for Rehana's nikah (marriage). On the same day, Shastri retires from his school teaching job. In the send-off ceremony, he informs his colleagues that post-retirement, he plans to dedicate himself to social and national service activities.

That night, Zafar Khan's followers show him guns that have been acquired from Pakistan and smuggled in through Kashmir. He inspects the guns and tells them that once the riots start, the guns should be distributed among their people.

An agitated group of Kar Sevaks comes to Shastri, telling him that the forcibly constructed 500-year-old Babri Masjid is an insult to their religion and concrete steps need to be taken for the construction of the Ram Mandir. Shastri tries to pacify them and tells them to not take to violence.

Separately, a group of Kar Sevaks decides to raise funds from the people for the Ram Mandir construction and a mass funds collection drive is initiated. The next day, two Kar Sevaks doing door-to-door funds collections are attacked and killed by a group of Muslims armed with knives and machetes.

That night, Shastri writes a letter to Zafar Khan, that as he is a prominent and honoured member of the Muslim community, he wishes to inform him that "Just as the Muslims revere Mecca and Medina, similarly Hindus revere the birthplace of Lord Ram. It is proven that in 1528, Mir Baqi had destroyed a temple and built a mosque in its place, and also thousands of Hindus were massacred. After the country's independence, the hope of reconstruction of the Ram Mandir was reawakened and since we all have to live here in peace, why don't Muslims help us in the construction of the Ram Mandir? This will also strengthen Hindu-Muslim relations."

On reading the letter, Zafar Khan is incensed and asks, "Is India only for Hindus? We Muslims have also shed our blood for the independence of this country. He has no proof that there was a temple at the spot earlier." He tells his followers to prepare to defend the Babri Masjid.

The next day, Rehana and her friend Bharti are out shopping for her upcoming wedding, when Shastri too arrives there. Bharti informs him that Rehana's wedding has been fixed. Shastri is happy and asks Rehana's father Naushad Ali how he forgot to inform him. Naushad says that the reason is that he did not want the tensions between Shastri and Zafar Khan to affect Rehana's life. Shastri is disappointed on hearing this and says that he has always considered Rehana as his daughter and his blessings are with her, and goes away. Rehana is embarrassed and sad and after getting home, tells her father that Shastri sir is a good man and there should be no problem in inviting him to the wedding. They have an argument over this.

Three days later, Rehana marries Arif Khan, who is Zafar Khan's son. The same evening, Rehana's friend Bharti comes home dejected and tells her parents that she is sad that Rehana got married but she did not get invited to the wedding.

Realising Zafar Khan is not responding positively to his letter, Shastri addresses his followers and tells them that in the past Hindus were disunited and as a result, the Mughal emperor Babur destroyed the Ram Temple and built the Babri Masjid. Henceforth, Hindus cannot afford to be disunited and must become strong.

A group of Muslims gather outside Zafar Khan's Madrassa and shout slogans against him. When he comes out they tell him that they do not want to heed his words as they have always had good relations with Hindus and also have business relations with them. They do not wish to spoil these age-old relationships.

Zafar Khan gets angry and admonishes them "You should be ashamed of yourselves that you have forgotten that your ancestors have told you to wage Jihad on Kafirs, and that Kafirs must burn in the fires of Jahannam. You should be ashamed that you are planning to disobey the teachings of Allah, who has given you life and is the creator of everything. What answer will you give to Allah when you die for disobeying him? You must be ready to sacrifice for Allah and you must henceforth stop associating with the Hindus and also stop business dealings with them." He then tells them to go home, and they all leave.

Rehana calls Bharti in her office and apologises to her for not inviting her to the wedding.

A group of concerned Muslims approach Naushad Ali and complain to him that Zafar Khan is inciting Muslims to violence. They tell him that they do not want violence with Hindus and they do not wish to spoil their relations. They then tell him that Khan is getting funding from Pakistan to create trouble in India. They ask him to talk to Zafar Khan and make him understand the need for peace.

Arif sees Rehana lost in thought and asks her the matter. Rehana tells him that "I'm missing Shastri sir, who has always treated me as his daughter and advised me in the right direction. He always helps people in need and is a good person." Arif does not like her praising Shastri and leaves from there.

Rehana overhears her father-in-law Zafar Khan planning the assassination of Shastri. Rehana calls her friend Bharti about it, who in turn alerts the police. The police raid the procession that Shastri is leading and arrest the would-be assassins as well as Shastri.

Soon after, it is reported in the news that masses of Kar Sevaks have climbed atop the Babri Masjid and demolished it.

Arif realises that it is Rehana who informed Bharti, and confronts her. She admits to it and reprimands Arif for planning to kill Shastri, who has been like a father to her, and for planning violence in the city. Arif gets angry and divorces her on the spot by uttering Talaq three times.

The next day, Arif regrets having given Talaq to Rehana and asks a Maulvi for advise and that he wishes to marry Rehana again. The Maulvi tell him and his father Zafar Khan that as per the Shariah Law, Arif is not allowed to remarry Rehana unless she goes through a Nikah halala first, meaning she has to marry another man, who must consummate their marriage, and then give her Talaq.

When Naushad Ali hears that his daughter Rehana must go through Nikah halala in order to remarry Arif, he suffers a heart attack and collapses.
In hospital, while recovering he says, "Sometimes our false ego causes us to sacrifice our children. I wish my eyes had not been covered by the curtain of religion, so my daughter would not have to see this day."

Zafar Khan says that if the news of Rehana's Nikah halala is revealed in public, it would cause dishonor to the family. So in order to prevent the word from going out in public, he himself would do Nikah halala with Rehana.

The nikah ceremony is carried out, and Zafar Khan and Rehana get married. That night, when he enters Rehana's bedroom, offers alcohol to Rehana, telling her it will reduce the pain and embarrassment of the situation. But when he undresses her to commit Halala, he is enamored by her youthful beauty and the two have sex all night, while Arif listens Rehana moan from outside regretting his decision to divorce her.

The next morning when Arif asks Zafar to give her Talaq so that he can remarry her, Zafar says "Due to my old age, I could not complete the Halala and need a few more days to do so. I will try my best and once successful, I will give Talaq to Rehana." He then tells a weeping Arif that until then, Arif must look at Rehana as his mother, or else it would be a violation of the Shariah, and Allah would never forgive him.

In the meanwhile, Bharti approaches Syed Waseem Rizvi, the head of the Uttar Pradesh Shia Central Wakf Board for help in promoting peace during these uncertain times. Rizvi tells her "I agree with your thoughts and I too do not want violence and bloodshed. I am a human first, then an Indian, and lastly a Muslim. Islam teaches peace, but the head of the Sharia Board Zafar Khan has strange thoughts and wants to force his wishes. I will talk to Zafar Khan on the matter as well as arrange for Shastri's bail."

That night, Arif is morosely looking at Rehana, when Zafar arrives and again tells him "You must consider Rehana as your mother and not allow any 'napak' (impure) thoughts about her enter your mind or else it would be an offence against the Shariah and Allah. So you must control your emotions."

When Zafar Khan enters the bedroom, Rehana asks him, "Truthfully admit who is it that has the 'napak' thoughts, Arif or you? In your lust for your daughter-in-law, you are even deceiving your own son." Zafar Khan gets angry and hits her and then rapes her.

The next day, Syed Waseem Rizvi visits Khan in his madrasa and reminds him that "The Babri Masjid was built after destroying pre-existing temples and we Muslims should give up the claim on the Babri Masjid land and instead move the mosque to an alternate location. In the past also, a number of mosques have shifted locations. For the sake of peace, we Muslims should return it to the Hindus."

Khan accuses him of having accepted money for speaking on behalf of the Hindus, and also that the Babri Masjid is the property of the Sunni community and they will not compromise over their property. He tells Rizvi that the Shia have no claim on the Babri Masjid in either case.

Rizvi reminds Khan that a part of the Babri Masjid was built by Mir Baqi, who was a Shia and therefore the Shias too have a say over the matter. The part that was built by Mir Baqi got illegally encroached upon by the Sunni board in 1948 and the Shia Board does not wish to enter into a conflict over this.

Khan tells Rizvi to go back to his Hindu friends and tell them that they have committed a grave crime by destroying the Babri masjid and the Sunni Muslims are determined to rebuild the Babri Masjid at the very same spot. He asks Rizvi why is he concerned because since the Shia do not love the Caliphs, they are not even true Muslims.

The talks further break down and Rizvi leaves from there.

That night, Arif sees Rehana sitting under a tree and crying. When he asks her to come inside the house, she asks him, "Where should I go, to the same Dozakh (hell) where life is worse than death?" 
Arif responds, "I understand your pain, but I am helpless. As a Muslim, I have to obey the Shariat. How can you even raise questions about the Shariat?" Rehana replies, "I am ashamed to be in a place where in the name of Halala, the father-in-law has sex with the daughter-in-law. The same person who I used to consider like my father, is satisfying his lust for sex with my body using the excuse of Shariat."

The next morning, Arif confronts his father and asks him to give talaq to Rehana. But his father tells him, "Until I am able to do complete Halala, I cannot give Talaq to Rehana." So Arif asks him, "Cannot give, or do not want to give? I have understood that Shariat has nothing to do with Halala." Zafar tells him to mind his language. In response, Arif pulls out a gun and threatens to shoot himself unless his father gives Talaq to Rehana immediately. Left with no option, Zafar immediately gives Triple Talaq to Rehana and tells Arif he will arrange for his immediate Nikah to Rehana as well.

Rizvi calls a meeting of eminent Shia scholars and tells them, "As you all know, ever since the Babri structure was demolished, some greedy and insidious Mullahs have started inciting riots and over 2000 people have been killed. I am concerned about the future of Muslims in India. We do not want to fight and take away the rights of the Hindus. Ram Mandir is the right of the Hindus and they must have it. Even during the Battle of Karbala, an army of Hindus from India had come to help Imam Hussain in his cause, and even today we recognise them as Hussaini Brahmins. We can never forget the help that the Hindus extended to us. The Ramjanmabhoomi of Ayodhya belongs to Lord Ram and there should be a temple of Lord Ram built there. We can always have a 'Masjid-e-aman' (Mosque of peace) about 150 to 200 kilometres away." The congregation of Shia scholars and clerics agree with him.

That night, Zafar Khan talks over the phone with a person in Pakistan and asks for funds to carry out a 'large incident'. His contact in Pakistan assures him of all the funds required to ensure Ram Mandir does not come up.

The next day, Shastri addresses a large gathering, where he praises and thanks Rizvi for his help towards the building of the Ram temple. Rizvi gives a speech denouncing the Mullahs who have conspired with Pakistan to create trouble in India. He says the Shia board will not allow this to happen and the Shias and the Hindus have together decided to build the Ram temple in Ayodhya and a mosque in a different location. Shastri announces that in return, he is donating the land of his ashram and cowshed to Rizvi for constructing the mosque.

That night, Bharti when visiting Rehana, overhears Zafar talking to his contact in Pakistan and conspiring to get Shastri killed. Zafar spots Bharti listening to his conversation and shouts out at her. When she runs away from the place, he sends his followers after her. They chase and shoot her, and leave her for dead. Bharti survives and is taken to a hospital. In the hospital, when a police officer questions her as to who shot her, she names Zafar Khan as the culprit and dies soon after.

Later, while Rizwi is being interviewed by reporters, he is shot at by some of Zafar's men. Rizwi takes cover behind a car and his bodyguard fires back, successfully neutralising two of the attackers.

Zafar laments that the attempt to kill Rizwi was unsuccessful and speculates that perhaps Bharti gave away his name to the police before dying. Soon after, the police raid Zafar Khan's madrasa and he is forced to escape. While escaping, he tells his followers "The time to escape has come. I am going to Pakistan."

Rizvi tells Shastri that he was aware that Zafar Khan has become like the devil, but never thought he would stoop to such levels and be responsible for the murder of thousands including Bharti and even commit Halala with his own daughter-in-law.
Shastri tells Rizvi, "I'm extremely saddened by the events. Bharti and Rehana are like my own daughters. I've heard that Rehana is not keeping good health and so I wish to see her once."

Arif takes Rehana to the doctor who examines her and says she is very weak. He tells Arif that she is pregnant and he should take special care of her due to her weakness.

On leaving the doctor's clinic, Arif thanks Rehana and says she has made him very happy with the news that she is pregnant but asks her why she is not looking happy that she is going to be a mother.

Rehana replies, "I am very happy, but don't know if the baby is your son or your brother." On hearing her remark, Arif is devastated and staggers against the wall.

Rehana walks up to the edge of the hospital building and bids Arif goodbye. Before Arif can stop her, she jumps off the building and commits suicide. Shastri, who is also there is shocked at seeing Rehana's dead body. Arif arrives near Rehana's dead body and breaks down crying.

That night, Shastri is seen walking towards the river bank where prayers are being conducted. However, an armed Muslim man arrives on the scene and shoots him dead.

Cast
 Manoj Joshi as Sadanand Shastri: Bharti's father, Rehana's sworn uncle and Naushad Ali's friend
 Govind Namdeo as Zafar Khan: Head of All India Sharia Board, Arif's father and Rehana's father-in-law later turned second husband,
 Waseem Rizvi as Himself: Head of Shia Waqf Board and Shastri's accompalice.
 Nazneen Patni as Rehana: Naushad Ali's daughter, Bharti's bestfriend, Shastri sworn niece, Arif's wife later turned step-mom and Zafar's daughter-in-law later turned second wife. 
 Rajveer Singh as Arif Khan: Zafar's son and Rehana's first husband
 Manveer Choudhaary as Rahman 
 Trisha Sachdeva as Bharti: Shastri's daughter and Rehana's bestfriend.
 Aditya as Nazin
 Vikas Kumar as Muslim character
 Raj Soni as Hindu character

Release 
In December 2018, following the release of the trailer, a Bombay high court ruling restrained Rizvi from releasing the film without authorization from the Central Board of Film Certification.

On March 28, 2019, the Supreme Court refused to stop the release of the film, in response to a petition claiming that the release of the film would vitiate the ongoing mediation proceedings in the Ayodhya land dispute case.

References

External links
 
 
 Ram Ki Janmabhoomi film on MXPlayer

2019 drama films
2019 films
2010s Hindi-language films
Indian drama films
Drama films based on actual events
Hindi-language drama films
Films about religious violence in India
Ayodhya dispute
Films set in Uttar Pradesh
Films about Hinduism
Films about Islam
Indian films based on actual events
Hindi-language films based on actual events